Ángel Antar (born 18 February 1972 in Asunción, Paraguay) is a retired Paraguayan association footballer.

Career
In 2000, Antar's only goal of the season came against Cerro Porteño. In 2003, he scored one goal for Deportivo Recoleta in the Division Intermedia. In the same month, Antar transferred from Recoleta to 3 de Febrero in Ciudad del Este, in the same team as Oscar Cardozo. Antar played for Galatasary for one year and a half.

International career
Antar debuted for Paraguay against Australia in 2000. His team mates in the squad featured José Luís Chilavert.

References

External links
 

Living people
1972 births
Paraguayan footballers
Paraguayan expatriate footballers
Paraguay international footballers
Association football defenders
Club Sportivo San Lorenzo footballers
Club Libertad footballers
Real Sociedad de Zacatecas footballers
Paraguayan Primera División players
Paraguayan people of Lebanese descent
Sportspeople from Asunción
Sportspeople of Lebanese descent